Jakob von Gunten. Ein Tagebuch is a novel by Swiss writer Robert Walser, first published in German in 1909.

Introduction

Jakob von Gunten is a first-person account told by its titular protagonist, a young man of noble background who runs off from home and decides to spend the rest of his life serving others. To this end, he enrolls at the Benjamenta Institute, a school for servants.

Walser based the novel on his own experiences: upon arriving in Berlin in 1905 he attended a school for servants, and served as a butler the following winter.

Walser in Jakob von Gunten uses  an "ordinary and internalized narrative, turning the novel into what Walser’s translator Christopher Middleton in the novel’s afterword calls, 'an analytic fictional soliloquy'".

Plot summary

Jakob von Gunten comes from a well-off family. His father has a car and horse at his disposal and his mother has her own box at the theatre. His brother Johann is a well-known, established artist, who cultivates a bourgeois lifestyle and moves in elite circles. Jakob runs away from home in order to escape the overbearing shadow of his father, an alderman. He joins a school for servants, situated on one floor at the rear of a house in Berlin. The headmaster of the institute is Herr Benjamenta. Due to a lack of teaching staff, the pupils are taught by the headmaster’s sister, Lisa Benjamenta. There are in fact more teachers, but they are either absent or said to be fast asleep. The pupils are trained as servants with the aim of securing a job. The teaching predominantly consists of learning-by-heart from one of the institute’s brochures with the title "What is the aim of Benjamenta’s School for Boys?" and from the "Rules". The pupils willingly let themselves be treated like children, drilled and pushed hard. A principle of the Institute is: "Little, but thoroughly". They are taught how to deal with people in social situations through theory and role-play.

As a new pupil Jakob is tested by the headmaster. At first he rebels, walks into his office and demands his money back, resenting the poor quality of the education. But then he acquiesces and ends his attempts at revolution.  Jakob later gets mixed up in a fight and receives a hit to the head from the headmaster who doesn’t ascertain who was initially responsible. Jakob does not feel inferior. On the contrary, he has ample self-confidence and considers himself the brightest among his classmates. Jakob considers himself conceited and arrogant. His pride is slightly injured and Jakob presumes that he is being dumbed down by the institute. He knows in any case that he is being made to look small.

The headmaster confesses to Jakob that he has a fondness for him which he can no longer control. He perceives something special in Jakob. The headmaster has no explanation for this. Jakob is also surprised, but knows how to act around superiors. He wisely says nothing in reply – even when the headmaster confesses his love for him. When Jakob is supposed to become the friend and confidant of the headmaster the pupil is hesitant. Jakob does not get a job through the headmaster because the headmaster, already over 40, loves someone for the first time and doesn't want to let him go. But then Jakob becomes afraid; the headmaster wants to choke him. Later, however, the headmaster wants to kiss Jakob. Outraged, the splendid young boy refuses.

Frau Benjamenta tells Jakob she is going to die. Herr Benjamenta and Jakob sit in vigil over her dead body before she is taken away. The school has been failing for a long time, with a falling intake of pupils. Jakob agrees to pack up and go travelling with Herr Benjamenta.

J. M. Coetzee's review in "The Genius of Robert Walser" (2000)

Nobel prize laureate John Maxwell Coetzee originally published his review—a reappreciation of an almost forgotten classic—in The New York Review of Books Vol.47, No.17 (2 November 2000). It was later reprinted in his Inner Workings: Literary Essays, 2000-2005.

Editions

 The first edition of the German original was published in Berlin in 1909 by Bruno Cassirer.
 Jakob von Gunten, translated from the German and with an Introduction by Christopher Middleton (originally published in 1969, since then reprinted in NYRB Classics, 1999).
 Today the novel is available in a number of editions, most notably by Suhrkamp Verlag. In 2008, the Süddeutsche Zeitung chose Jakob von Gunten as one of 100 "great novels of the 20th century" (a selection which includes translations from other languages) and published a special edition.

Film adaptations

A 1971 German television movie, Jakob von Gunten, was directed by Peter Lilienthal.
In 1995, the novel was adapted into the film Institute Benjamenta, or This Dream People Call Human Life by the Brothers Quay, starring Mark Rylance as Jakob von Gunten.

External links
 e-text (in German) from Project Gutenberg
 J. M. Coetzee: "The Genius of Robert Walser"

References

1909 novels
Swiss novels
Fiction set in 1905
Novels set in Berlin
Novels set in schools